The Lopingian is the uppermost series/last epoch of the Permian. It is the last epoch of the Paleozoic. The Lopingian was preceded by the Guadalupian and followed by the Early Triassic.

The Lopingian is often synonymous with the informal terms late Permian or upper Permian.

The name was introduced by Amadeus William Grabau in 1931 and derives from Leping, Jiangxi in China. It consists of two stages/ages. The earlier is the Wuchiapingian and the later is the Changhsingian.

The International Chronostratigraphic Chart (v2018/07) provides a numerical age of 259.1 ±0.5 Ma. If a Global Boundary Stratotype Section and Point (GSSP) has been approved, the lower boundary of the earliest stage determines numerical age of an epoch. The GSSP for the Wuchiapingian has a numerical age of 259.8 ± 0.4 Ma.

Evidence from Milankovitch cycles suggests that the length of an Earth day during this epoch was approximately 22 hours.

The Lopingian ended with the Permian–Triassic extinction event.

See also 
 Geologic time scale

References

 
03
Geological epochs